Marriage (Italian: Il matrimonio) is a 1954 Italian historical comedy film directed by Antonio Petrucci and starring Vittorio De Sica, Silvana Pampanini and Alberto Sordi. It consists of three segments, based on three stage plays by Anton Chekhov.

It was shot at the Cinecittà Studios in Rome. The film's sets were designed by the art director Gianni Polidori.

Plot
Grisna Smirnov Vittorio De Sica courts Elena Silvana Pampanini with almost fatal results.

Cast  
Vittorio De Sica as Grisna Smirnov 
Silvana Pampanini as  Elena Ivanovna Popova 
Alberto Sordi as  Ivan Vassilievic Lomov   
Valentina Cortese as Natalia
Renato Rascel as Revunov 
Guglielmo Barnabò as Stefan Ciubucov 
Bice Valori as Levatrice  
Ave Ninchi as Nastasia 
Carlo Sposito as  Epaminonda Massinovich
 Franco Scandurra as Andrej Andrejevich Niunin 
 Pina Bottin as Daschenka, la sposa 
 Nino Milano as Kharlampy Marshmallopolis, il mercante greco 
 Vittorina Benvenuti as Maria, la domestica della vedova Popova 
 Bruno Smith as Luca, il cocchiere 
 Attilio Martella as Ivan Mihailovich, il telegrafista 
 Gustavo Serena as Scingalov, il padre della sposa 
 Pietro De Santis as Vanya, il servo della vedova Popova

References

External links

1954 films
1950s historical comedy films
Italian historical comedy films
Films set in Rome
Films shot at Cinecittà Studios
1950s Italian-language films
1954 comedy films
1950s Italian films